Jason Coronel Martínez (born 10 September 1993) is a Nicaraguan footballer who plays for Diriangén FC.

References

1993 births
Living people
Nicaraguan men's footballers
Association football midfielders
Nicaragua international footballers